A business fable (also termed business fiction or leadership fable) is a motivational fable, parable or other fictional story that shares a lesson or lessons that are intended to be applied in the business world with the aim to improve leadership skills, personal skills, or the organizational culture. Business fables show readers how the different leadership, project management, and other tools can be used in real life situations. 
The genre saw a peak in the early 2000s.

Despite predictions from the Harvard Business Review, business fables are still being produced and read. Patrick Lencioni  and Jon Gordon  continue their long standing writing careers in the genre of leadership fables. In addition several independents and authors from smaller publishing houses are joining the genre. Long-time established author Patrick Lencioni, who wrote one of the highest rated business books on Goodreads, is helping new authors to write their business fables. 

Business fables may not provide all the details found in a traditional business book, but a fictional narrative can affect the emotions of the audience, unlike a conventional tome. Some authors and publishers are providing details into the key aspects of how to write a successful Business fable.
  Others point out the flaws in some business fables and how authors can improve their stories.  Many authors augment their business fables with workbooks and materials that can be downloaded from their websites.

New York Times bestsellers in the business fable genre include:

 
 
 
 
 
  Later republished by  St. Martin's Press, Macmiliians, and Portfolio.

Other notable business fables include:
 
 
 Fish! Philosophy by Stephen Lundin (2000)
 The Chicken and the Pig

See also 
 Self-help book
 Motivational speaker
 Popular psychology

References 

 
Motivation
Popular psychology books
Management books